The 2007 Women's Dunlop British Open Squash Championships was held at the National Squash Centre in Manchester from 19–24 September 2007. The event was won for the third time by Rachael Grinham who defeated Nicol David in the final.

Seeds

Draw and results

First qualifying round

Second qualifying round

First round

Quarterfinals

Semi-finals

Final

References

Women's British Open Squash Championships
Squash in England
Sports competitions in Manchester
Women's British Open Squash Championship
2000s in Manchester
Women's British Open Squash Championship
2007 in women's squash